is a Japanese actor and voice actor from Saitama Prefecture. affiliated with Himawari Theatre Group. He won Best Male Rookie at 5th Seiyu Awards. He also received one of Best Voice Actors at Tokyo Anime Award Festival in 2015.

Filmography

Television animation

Original video animation (OVA)

Film

Tokusatsu

Video games

Other dubbing

References

External links
Official agency profile 

1990 births
Living people
Japanese male child actors
Japanese male video game actors
Japanese male voice actors
Male voice actors from Saitama Prefecture
Waseda University alumni
Square Enix people
20th-century Japanese male actors
21st-century Japanese male actors
Seiyu Award winners